Razia Banu is a Awami League politician and the former Member of the Bangladesh Parliament of women's reserved seat.

Early life and family
Razia Banu was born in the District of Dacca in the erstwhile Bengal Presidency, to a Bengali Muslim family. Her father was Wazir Ali, son of Baiyam Mia. Her mother, Nafisi Bibi, was the daughter of A. K. Fazlul Huq, the first Prime Minister of Bengal, and the sister of Bangladeshi politician A. K. Faezul Huq.

Career
In 1954, Banu was elected to the East Bengal Legislative Assembly. After the independence of Bangladesh, she was elected to the first Jatiya Sangsad from women's reserved seat as an Awami League candidate in 1973.

Personal life
Banu is married to Syed Mahbubur Rahman, a Bangladesh government secretary from Batamara in Bhola.

References

Awami League politicians
Living people
1st Jatiya Sangsad members
Women members of the Jatiya Sangsad
Year of birth missing (living people)
20th-century Bangladeshi women politicians
Bangladesh Krishak Sramik Awami League central committee members